Chris Roberts (born Christian Franz Klusáček; 13 March 1944 – 2 July 2017) was a German schlager singer and actor. He was born in Munich-Schwabing and was married to the singer and actress Claudia Roberts; they often performed on stage together.

Biography
Roberts was most popular as a singer in Germany in the 1970s; he charted there with 24 songs between 1968 and 1980. He also acted in a number of films during that time. He represented Luxembourg as a part of a sextet in the Eurovision Song Contest 1985 in which they sang "Children, Kinder, Enfants". They earned 37 points and attained 13th position. Roberts' first two singles, "Baby's Gone" and "Welchen Weg soll ich gehen", were released under the artist name Chris Robert.

Death
Chris Roberts died after suffering lung cancer. He was survived by his wife Claudia Roberts.

Discography
Albums
{| style="width:100%;"
|-
|  style="vertical-align:top; width:28%;"|
1970: Die Maschen der Mädchen
1971: Unsere Pauker geh'n in die Luft (soundtrack; Wencke Myhre & Chris Roberts)
1971: Chris Roberts
1971: Verliebt in die Liebe
1971: Zum Verlieben
1972: Hab' Sonne im Herzen
1972: Die großen Erfolge
1972: Verliebt in die Liebe
1972: Die Maschen der Mädchen
1972: Love me
1973: Wenn jeder Tag ein Sonntag wär''' (Chris Roberts & Ireen Sheer)
1973: Hab' ich dir heute schon gesagt, daß ich dich liebe1973: Eine Freude vertreibt 100 Sorgen1973: Unser Wunschkonzert mit Chris Roberts1973: Meine Lieblingslieder1973: Chris Roberts1974: Ein paar schöne Stunden1974: Dezember1974: Fröhliche Weihnachtszeit1975: Du kannst nicht immer 17 sein1975: Ich mach ein glückliches Mädchen aus dir1976: Du wirst wieder tanzen geh'n1976: Herzlichst Chris Roberts1976: Kommst Du zu mir heute Abend1977: Treffpunkt Stars1977: Die Goldenen Super 201977: Die großen Erfolge1977: Wann liegen wir uns wieder in den Armen (Barbara)1978: Star-Discothek1978: Du bist mein Mädchen1978: 10 Jahre Chris Roberts Erfolge1978: CR1980: Chris & Friends1980: Denk daran, ich brauche Dich1980: Das Star Album|  style="vertical-align:top; width:34%;"|
1981: Ich bin verliebt in die Liebe1982: Ausgewählte Goldstücke: Chris Roberts1984: Hautnah1986: Star Gala1990: Golden Stars1992: Die Maschen der Mädchen1993: Meine grossen Erfolge1994: Hinter den Wolken ist immer Sonnenschein1994: Claudia & Chris Roberts und die Glückskinder: Traumluftballon1995: Star Gala Chris Roberts – Ich bin verliebt in die Liebe1995: Meine schönsten Erfolge1995: Star Gold – Die großen Erfolge1995: Hinter den Wolken ist immer Sonnenschein1996: 30 Jahre Chris Roberts – Diese wunderbaren Jahre1997: Du kannst nicht immer 17 sein1997: Claudia & Chris Roberts: Vergiß die Liebe nicht!1998: Best of Chris Roberts2000: Seine großen Erfolge2000: Schlager Rendezvous2000: Meine größten Erfolge2000: Ich bin verliebt in die Liebe (CD)
2000: Dezember (CD)
2000: Meine grössten Erfolge (2CD)
2002: Momente2002: Du kannst nicht immer 17 sein (CD)
2003: Chris Roberts2004: Von allem das Beste2004: Ich bin verliebt in die Liebe (CD)
2005: Nur das Allerbeste2006: Du kannst nicht immer siebzehn sein2007: Ein Mädchen nach Mass (Chris & Claudia Roberts)
2007: Seine schönsten Lieder (3CD)
2008: Schlagerjuwelen – Seine großen Erfolge2009: Star Edition2009: Das Beste aus 40 Jahre Hitparade|}

Filmography
1970: When the Mad Aunts Are Coming1970: 1970: Musik, Musik – da wackelt die Penne1971: ...und sowas nennt sich Show1971: ...und heute heißt es Show1971: Aunt Trude from Buxtehude 
1971: Rudi, Behave!1971: The Reverend Turns a Blind Eye1972: Don't Get Angry1972: My Daughter, Your Daughter1972: Always Trouble with the Reverend1972: Von uns für Sie (TV series)
1973: 1976: Jetzt geht die Party richtig los1977: Plattenküche – Episode #1.7 (TV)
1979: Da kommt was auf uns zu1983: Sunshine Reggae in Ibiza''

Awards
1970: Goldene Europa
1971: Goldene Europa
1971: Bravo Otto – Gold
1972: Bravo Otto – Gold (begin of year)
1972: Bravo Otto – Silver (end of year)
1975: Goldene Europa
1981: Goldene Stimmgabel
1984: Goldene Stimmgabel
1985: Goldene Stimmgabel

References

External links

1944 births
2017 deaths
German male singers
German male film actors
German people of Czech descent
Eurovision Song Contest entrants for Luxembourg
Eurovision Song Contest entrants of 1985
Deaths from lung cancer in Germany
Musicians from Munich